Propyria is a genus of moths in the subfamily Arctiinae. The genus was erected by George Hampson in 1898.

Species
Propyria schausi (Dyar, 1898)
Propyria ptychoglene Hampson, 1898
Propyria criton (Druce, 1885)

References

Cisthenina
Moth genera